Helmuth Schmalzl (born 8 October 1948) is an Italian former alpine skier who competed in the 1972 Winter Olympics.

References

External links
 

1948 births
Living people
Italian male alpine skiers
Olympic alpine skiers of Italy
Alpine skiers at the 1972 Winter Olympics
Germanophone Italian people
People from Urtijëi
Sportspeople from Südtirol
Italian alpine skiing coaches